The Waterstones Book of the Year, established in 2012, is an annual award presented to a book published in the previous 12 months. Waterstones' booksellers nominate and vote to determine the winners and finalists for the prize.

Award winners receive "full and committed backing" from Waterstones both in-person and online.

Recipients

See also 

 Waterstones Children's Book Prize
 Waterstones Debut Fiction Prize

References 

Awards established in 2012
English-language literary awards
2012 establishments in the United Kingdom